The Bacolod South Road is a , two-to-six lane major north–south lateral highway that connects the city of Bacolod to the municipality of Hinoba-an in the province of Negros Occidental, Philippines.

The road forms part of National Route 7 (N7), National Route 6 (N6), and National Route 712 (N712) of the Philippine highway network.

Route description

Bacolod 
The road starts at the kilometer zero of Negros Island located along the Provincial Capitol of Negros Occidental in Bacolod.

Bago to Kabankalan

Kabankalan to Hinoba-an

Intersections

References 

Roads in Negros Occidental